Hot pink is one of various shades of pink.

Hot Pink may refer to:

 Hot Pink (album), by Doja Cat, 2019
 Hot Pink (The Pink Spiders album), 2005
 "Hot Pink", a song by Let's Eat Grandma from the 2018 album I'm All Ears

See also
 Pink (disambiguation)